Strength in Numbers is an album by 24-7 Spyz. It is the only album to feature Jeff Brodnax, who replaced original vocalist P. Fluid in 1991. On their third effort, the Spyz concentrate on simpler and more direct songwriting. The album has been described as a hard rock album with elements of heavy metal, funk, New York hardcore, R&B, jazz and reggae.

The Seattle grunge movement overpowered the music industry in 1992, leaving the Spyz without a record contract or media attention in the midst of their creative peak.

After the release of the album, the Spyz would take a break before reforming their classic lineup in 1995.

Like many 24-7 Spyz albums, this recording is out of print but this album is available on streaming platforms.

Track listing
 "Break the Chains"
 "Crime Story"
 "Judgment Day"
 "Understanding"
 "Got It Goin' On"
 "My Desire"
 "Purple"
 "Stuntman"
 "Earth and Sky"
 "Room #9"
 "Sireality"
 "Last Call"
 "I'm Not Going"
 "Traveling Day"

Personnel

 Jeff Brodnax – vocals
 Jimi Hazel – guitar
 Rick Skatore – bass
 Joel Maitoza – drums

References

1992 albums
24-7 Spyz albums